Óscar Faura is a Spanish cinematographer.

Career 
Faura graduated from ESCAC Film School and has been a cinematographer since 1999, working for both film and advertisement industry. He shot the international hit The Orphanage (2007), a nominee for the European Film Award and garnered further acclaim for The Impossible (2012), starring Naomi Watts and Ewan McGregor. Other successful films under his credits include Mindscape (2013). He is a frequent collaborator of director Juan Antonio Bayona.

In November 2013, he finished shooting the historical drama film The Imitation Game (2014), starring Benedict Cumberbatch and released in the US by The Weinstein Company.

Filmography 

Camera Operator
 Los sin nombre (1999)
 Los cuentos de tío Paco (1999)
 REC 2 (2007)

Director of photography: Second unit
 Fragile (2005)
 Summer Rain (2006)
 Transsiberian (2008)
 Agora (2009)
 Biutiful (2010)

Awards and nominations

References

External links
 

Spanish cinematographers
Living people
1975 births
People from Barcelona